Thorunn Ormsdottir (Þórunn Ormsdóttir; died 1431) was the abbess of the Benedictine convent Reynistaðarklaustur in Iceland 1402–1431.

Thorunn Ormsdottir assumed the position of abbess and took the responsibility of the convent and its lands after the former abbess and several of the nuns died in the Black plague in 1402. She was, however, never formally ordained as such. During the last year of her tenure, her convent was the center of a great scandal, when one of its members, Thora Illugadottir, had a child with the priest Thorthur Hrobjartsson, who was forced by the Bishop to make a pilgrimage to Rome. The couple, however, had another child after his return.

References 
„„Reynistaðarklaustur“. Tímarit Hins íslenska bókmenntafélags, 8. árg. 1887.“,
„„Reynistaðarklaustur“. Sunnudagsblað Tímans, 6. ágúst 1967.“,

14th-century Icelandic women
15th-century Icelandic women
1431 deaths
Year of birth unknown